Custance is an English surname. Notable people with this name include:

Arthur Custance (1910–1985), Canadian physiologist and writer
A. I. Custance, pseudonym of Aleen Isobel Cust (1868–1937), pioneering female veterinary surgeon
Craig Custance, sportswriter for The Athletic Detroit
Henry Custance, British jockey.
John D. Custance (1842–1923), agricultural scientist in South Australia
Lara Custance, New Zealand actress.
Olive Custance (1874–1944), British poet and wife of Lord Alfred Douglas
Rafe Custance, New Zealand actor.
Reginald Custance (1847–1935), Royal Navy officer
William Neville Custance (1811–1886), British Army officer
Wilfred Custance (1884–1939), senior officer in the Royal Navy